The Olympus Zuiko Digital ED 150mm 1:2.0 is an interchangeable camera lens announced by Olympus Corporation on September 27, 2004.

References
http://www.dpreview.com/products/olympus/lenses/oly_150_2/specifications

External links
 

150mm f 2.0 ED
Camera lenses introduced in 2004